The 2010 North Dakota State Bison women's soccer team represented North Dakota State University during the 2010 NCAA Division I women's soccer season. The Bison play their conference games in the Summit League.
NDSU made the Summit League tournament tied for the second seed. The Bison beat third-seeded South Dakota State in the semifinals and then beat fourth-seeded Western Illinois to win the Summit League championship. In the NCAA tournament the Bison fell to 9th ranked Texas A&M in penalties. This was the program's first NCAA tournament appearance since entering Division I.

Previous Season
The Bison finished the 2009 season with a 7-2 Summit League record and a 10-8-2 overall record. NDSU entered the postseason tied for first place in the conference, and received the third seed in the Summit League tournament. But they fell to second-seeded IUPUI in the semifinal match to be eliminated from the tournament.

Team Personnel

Roster

Reference:

Coaching Staff

Reference:

Schedule

|-
!colspan=6 style=""| Non-conference Regular Season

|-
!colspan=6 style=""| Summit League Regular Season

|-
!colspan=6 style=""| Summit League Tournament

|-
!colspan=6 style=""|NCAA Tournament

Reference:

Season Honors

All-Summit League

First Team
 Abbey Moendkedick

Second Team
 Kalani Bertsch
 Holly Christian
 Morgan DeMike

All-Freshman
 Anisha Kinnarath
 Taylor Stainbrook

Defensive Player of the Year
 Abbey Moenkedick

All-Tournament Team
 Marissa Wolfgram (MVP)
 Quin Ryan
 Kalani Bertsch

Reference:

References

North Dakota State Bison